Chad Nimmer (born July 16, 1976) is an American politician who served in the Georgia House of Representatives from the 178th district from 2011 to 2019.

References

1976 births
Living people
Republican Party members of the Georgia House of Representatives
21st-century American politicians